The McIntyre Community Building was constructed in Schumacher, (Timmins) Ontario, Canada in 1938.The arena (commonly known as the "Mac") contains approximately 1300 seats and has a total capacity of 1931 including standing room. It is currently home to the Timmins Majors AAA Midget Hockey Club which plays in the Great North Midget Hockey League and the Timmins Rock hockey club which plays in the Northern Ontario Junior Hockey League.

In January 2008, a "McIntyre Ad Hoc Committee" was formed to examine ways to reduce the operating deficit and explore possible upgrades to the aging building.  Some of the recent renovations include the replacement of all of the arena seats, the installation of a new centre ice scoreboard, and a refurbished box office.  The McIntyre Arena was the main venue for the 2010 World U-17 Hockey Challenge held between December 29, 2009 and January 4, 2010.

The arena's seating capacity (approx. 1,300) is small by today's standards for a city the size of Timmins (pop. approx. 45,000).  Most communities of comparable size in Canada have a main arena seating capacity in the 3,000-5,000 range.  In order to host a junior hockey team or other major tenant, the city may need to expand the Mac and triple its seating capacity to approx. 4,000 seats.  This would facilitate larger events such as concerts, ice shows, and other sporting events.

Buildings and structures in Timmins
Sports venues in Ontario